Andrew S. Gilbert is an Australian actor best known for his portrayal of Tony Twist in Round the Twist (Series 3–4). He is also well known for his AFI Award–winning role in Kiss or Kill and other supporting work in Look Both Ways and The Dish ans well as his recent role as Gavin Braithwaite on the ABC series Bed of Roses. He is also known for his collaboration with Director David Caesar on his films Idiot Box, Mullet, Dirty Deeds and Prime Mover. He has been nominated for the AFI Award three times—for Kiss or Kill, Mullet and Paperback Hero—winning for the earlier.

Filmography

Never Tear Us Apart: The Untold Story of INXS (TV mini-series)
Dennie Farriss 
TV mini series (2014–2014)
The Doctor Blake Mysteries (TV series)
- Martin Callow
TV series (2013-2017)
- Holding the Man
Father Wallbridge 
Film (2017)
- Highway 
Freddie
Short (2016)
- Children of the Corn
Sheriff Gebler
Film (2020), Savage River - Hugh Lang (2022)

Personal life 
His daughters Olive, Miranda and Violet appeared alongside him in Look Both Ways.

References

External links
 

Living people
1961 births
Australian male film actors
Australian male television actors
Best Supporting Actor AACTA Award winners
20th-century Australian male actors
21st-century Australian male actors